Forsteronia is a genus of plants in the family Apocynaceae, first described as a genus in 1818. It is native to South America, Central America, Mexico, and the West Indies.

Species

Formerly included in Forsteronia but transferred to Pinochia in 2007:

 Forsteronia corymbosa (Jacq.) G.Mey. = Pinochia corymbosa (Jacq.) M.E.Endress & B.F.Hansen
 Forsteronia floribunda (Sw.) A.DC. = Pinochia floribunda (Sw.) M.E.Endress & B.F.Hansen
 Forsteronia monteverdensis J.F.Morales	= Pinochia monteverdensis (J.F.Morales) M.E.Endress & B.F.Hansen
 Forsteronia peninsularis Woodson = Pinochia peninsularis (Woodson) M.E.Endress & B.F.Hansen
 Forsteronia portoricensis Woodson = Pinochia corymbosa subsp. portoricensis (Woodson) M.E.Endress & B.F.Hansen

References

 
Apocynaceae genera
Taxonomy articles created by Polbot